Lac de l'Eychauda is a lake in Hautes-Alpes, France.

Eychauda